Ted (stylized as ted)  is a 2012 American satirical comedy film directed by Seth MacFarlane (in his directorial debut) and written by MacFarlane, Alec Sulkin, and Wellesley Wild. The film stars Mark Wahlberg and Mila Kunis, with Joel McHale and Giovanni Ribisi in supporting roles, and MacFarlane providing the voice and motion capture of the title character. The film tells the story of John Bennett, a Boston native whose childhood wish brings his teddy bear friend Ted to life. However, in adulthood, Ted and John's friendship begins to interfere with the progression of John's relationship with his girlfriend, Lori Collins. 

MacFarlane's feature-length directorial debut, the film is produced by Media Rights Capital and distributed by Universal Pictures. It was released in theaters in the United States on June 29, 2012, and was a box office hit, grossing $549.4 million against a $50–65 million budget. Ted was the highest-grossing comedy film of 2012, is the second highest-grossing R-rated comedy of all time (behind The Hangover Part II) and was nominated for the Academy Award for Best Original Song. It received generally positive reviews, and successfully launched a franchise, with a sequel released in 2015, and a prequel television series currently in development.

Plot

In 1985, eight-year-old John Bennett is a friendless only child living in Norwood, Massachusetts, a suburb of Boston, who wishes for his new Christmas gift, a jumbo teddy bear named Ted, to come to life and become his best friend. The wish coincides with a shooting star and comes true, much to the brief horror of his parents; word spreads and Ted briefly becomes a celebrity.

27 years later, John, now 35, and Ted are still living in Boston, and are still staunch companions enjoying a hedonistic life. John is dating Lori Collins whom he met at a dance club. As their fourth anniversary approaches, Lori hopes to marry John, but feels he can not move forward in life with Ted around. John is hesitant about making Ted leave, but he is persuaded to act when they find Ted at home with a group of prostitutes, with one defecating on the floor, after their anniversary dinner.

John finds Ted his own apartment and a job at a grocery store, where Ted begins dating his co-worker Tami-Lynn. Lori learns that John has been skipping work, using her as an excuse, to reluctantly continue to spend most of his time with Ted. John and Lori are invited to a party put on by Lori's womanizing manager Rex, but Ted lures John away to a party at his apartment with the pressured offer to meet Sam J. Jones, the star of their favorite film, Flash Gordon. John intends to stay only a few minutes, but gets caught up in the occasion. Lori finds John there and tearfully breaks up with him. A furious John blames Ted for ruining his relationship with Lori and disowns him.

John and Ted confront each other about their ruined friendship and then fight, but manage to reconcile after a violent brawl in John's hotel room (resulting in John being crushed by a television). To repair John's relationship with Lori, Ted arranges for an old lover, singer Norah Jones, to help by having John express his love for Lori with a song during her concert that Lori and Rex attend. He does an off-key rendition of the Octopussy theme song, "All Time High", by Rita Coolidge and is booed offstage. Lori is touched by the attempt and returns to her apartment, where Ted confesses to his role in John's relapse and offers to leave them alone forever if she talks to John.

Lori is persuaded, but Ted is kidnapped by Donny, a mentally unstable stalker who idolized Ted as a child. Donny plans to make Ted into his brutish son Robert's new toy. Ted manages to reach a phone to contact John, but is immediately recaptured by Donny and Robert. Realizing that Ted is in danger, John and Lori locate Donny's residence and track him to rescue Ted. The chase leads to Fenway Park, where John punches Robert, knocking him out, but during the chase, Ted is damaged and falls onto the field, ripped entirely in half. A police car arrives, forcing Donny to flee. John and Lori gather Ted's stuffing and Ted relays his wish that John be happy with Lori, before the magic in Ted fades away making him a normal teddy bear again.

Unwilling to lose Ted, a distraught John and Lori rush back to her apartment and unsuccessfully attempt to repair Ted. Feeling sad about her part in the incident, Lori makes a wish on a shooting star while John is asleep. The next morning, Ted is revived as a result of the wish (though he pretends to be mentally retarded at first) and reunites with John and Lori, encouraging them to resume their relationship. John then finally proposes to Lori and she accepts. Sometime later, John and Lori are married (with Sam Jones as the presiding minister), and Ted comfortably accepts having a life of his own, as he and Tami-Lynn continued their love affair. 

The narrator of the film provides the following; Sam Jones attempts to restart his career and moves into a studio apartment with Brandon Routh (who starred in the "god-awful Superman movie"). Rex gives up his pursuit of Lori, falls into a deep depression, and dies of Lou Gehrig's disease. Donny is arrested by the Boston Police Department for kidnapping Ted, but the charges are dropped because Ted's legal status is unclear. Robert hires a personal trainer, loses a significant amount of weight, and goes on to become Taylor Lautner.

Cast

 Mark Wahlberg as John Bennett, Ted's best friend who as a child wished he would come to life. An immature but mild-mannered slacker in his 30s who loves to smoke pot with his best friend.  
 Colton Shires as teenage John Bennett
 Bretton Manley as young John Bennett
 Seth MacFarlane as Ted , John's teddy bear and best friend. John wished him to life when he was a kid and the two have remained friends ever since. Ted grows up to be a crude, foul-mouthed, alcoholic teddy bear, but he is also a lovable cheeky-chappy and is highly protective of John.
 Zane Cowans as young Ted's voice.
 Tara Strong (uncredited) as Ted's "I Love You" function
 Mila Kunis as Lori Collins, John's girlfriend
 Joel McHale as Rex, Lori's manager and John's nemesis
 Giovanni Ribisi as Donny, Ted's biggest fan and stalker
 Aedin Mincks as Robert, Donny's son
 Patrick Warburton as Guy, John's co-worker
 Laura Vandervoort as Tanya, John's co-worker
 Matt Walsh as Thomas Murphy, John's boss
 Jessica Barth as Tami-Lynn McCafferty, Ted's girlfriend and co-worker
 Bill Smitrovich as Frank Stevens, Ted's boss
 Alex Borstein as Helen Bennett, John's mother
 Ralph Garman as Steve Bennett, John's father
 Jessica Stroup as Tracy, Lori's co-worker
 Sam J. Jones as himself
 Ryan Reynolds (uncredited) as Jared, Guy's boyfriend
 Norah Jones as herself
 Tom Skerritt as himself
 Mike Henry as a Southern newscaster
 Robert Wu as Quan Ming/Ming the Merciless
 Ted Danson (uncredited) as himself
 Patrick Stewart as narrator

Production

Seth MacFarlane's directorial debut is a live-action effort, with computer animation handled by visual effects facilities Tippett Studio and Iloura. MacFarlane wrote the screenplay with his Family Guy colleagues Alec Sulkin and Wellesley Wild. In a "behind the scenes" video, it was revealed that MacFarlane originally wanted to make Ted into an animated television show, much like his previous works Family Guy, American Dad!, and The Cleveland Show.

Originally, 20th Century Fox was offered to finance and distribute the movie, given its collaboration with MacFarlane for shows like Family Guy, American Dad!, and The Cleveland Show. However, MacFarlane wanted a $65 million budget for the movie, which Fox considered the price to be too high for the R-rated comedy film, let alone for a first-time director, and was skeptical about the film's future success. They also wanted it to have a PG-13 rating instead of an R, which MacFarlene, Sulkin, and Wild ended up writing a version of. However, despite this, Fox backed out and MacFarlane began to take the project elsewhere. On April 12, 2010, Universal Pictures announced that it had acquired the full rights to Ted after it agreed to the $65 million budget he requested and to direct the R rated version of the script.

On October 26, 2010, Mark Wahlberg joined in the project as the lead actor. Two months later on December 14, Mila Kunis, the voice actress for Meg Griffin from Family Guy, also joined the cast. On February 23, 2011, Giovanni Ribisi joined Mark Wahlberg and Mila Kunis in Ted. Filming began in May 2011 in Boston, Norwood and other locations in Massachusetts. Based on the standings on the left-field scoreboard, the climactic scene in Fenway Park appears to have been filmed on or around May 24, 2011.

The film was scheduled for release in the United States on July 13, 2012, but it was moved up to June 29, both to avoid competition with Ice Age: Continental Drift and following the delay of G.I. Joe: Retaliation. Internationally, the film was released in Australia on July 5, 2012, and on August 1, 2012, in the United Kingdom and Ireland.

Soundtrack
The film's soundtrack was released by Universal Republic Records on June 26, 2012. It features the score by Walter Murphy and songs by various artists such as Norah Jones and Queen. Seth MacFarlane co-wrote the opening theme "Everybody Needs a Best Friend" with Murphy. The song was later nominated for the Academy Award for Best Original Song at the 85th Academy Awards.

Track listing
All tracks by Walter Murphy except where indicated.

Other songs which do not appear on the soundtrack but are featured in the film include songs from Queen's Flash Gordon soundtrack: "Football Fight", "Battle Theme", and "The Hero", as well as the "Knight Rider Theme" by Stu Phillips, "Stayin' Alive" by "Bee Gees", "Kiss Kiss" by "Chris Brown" and "The Imperial March" by John Williams. The film trailers used the songs "Best Friend" by Harry Nilsson and "How You Like Me Now?" by The Heavy.

Marketing
To promote the film, Universal Pictures teamed up with Axe in a marketing campaign that involved the title character and the brand's hair care product Axe Hair. In one commercial, Ted takes a woman on a date to a fancy restaurant, where he brings her to orgasm under the table before handing another man a box of Axe Hair gel.

To promote the film in Japan, United International Pictures teamed up with Spike Chunsoft in a marketing campaign that involved the title character and Danganronpa bear mascot Monokuma, in which while watching the film, Monokuma says: "Wow, Ted is so sexy and hot... I wonder if he thinks I'M hot!?!?!? This movie is really fucking funny, thanks Seth MacFarlane. I can't wait to show this movie to my good friend Super Mario when I get into Super Smash Bros. Ted, Rated R15+. Available now!"

In February 2013, Wahlberg and MacFarlane (as Ted) made an appearance at the 85th Academy Awards, which MacFarlane himself hosted.

Release

Box office
Ted grossed $218.8 million in North America and $330.6 million overseas for a total gross of $549.4 million, against a budget of $50 million. It was Universal's highest-grossing film in 2012, ahead of Snow White and the Huntsman and Battleship (the only one to pass $400 million), and the 12th-highest-grossing film of 2012.

Asia
Ted debuted in first place in Taiwan and got the best comedy opening ever there. It also debuted in Hong Kong, with $1.4 million, and grossed $571,000 in its first week in South Korea, eventually grossing $8 million, $3.8 million and $1.8 million respectively. It also grossed $2.1 million in both Indonesia and Singapore, and $1.4 million in Thailand.

In January 2013, the film opened at number one in Japan, its final market, with $4.5 million, the best start ever for an R-rated comedy there. In comparison, it grossed more in its opening weekend than The Hangover Part II made in its entire run. The following weekend, it retained the No. 1 spot for the second consecutive frame, grossing $3.6 million at 137 dates, for a 10-day market cumulative total of $11.2 million. By its third weekend, the film stayed at the No. 1 spot for a third week, with earning down less than 10%, pushing Ted'''s overseas total past the $300 million mark, and making it the top grossing R-rated comedy of all time in Japan. It then had its fourth consecutive weekend at No. 1, drawing another $3 million at 354 locations in the country. Its cumulative total stands at $44 million grossed.

EuropeTed debuted with $14.3 million in the United Kingdom, making it the third-best debut ever for a Universal film behind Bridget Jones: The Edge of Reason and King Kong, eventually grossing over $48.9 million in the country. Ted was released in cinemas across the United Kingdom on August 3.

The film had a $7.4 million launch in Germany, holding #1 spot for three-straight weeks, eventually grossing over $31.4 million.

In Spain, it opened with $2.3 million, which is the highest ever for an original R-rated comedy there, eventually grossing over $14.3 million.

The film also had the best Hollywood comedy debut ever in Russia, grossing $5.5 million, eventually grossing $17 million.Ted spent its first 4 weeks atop the weekend box office in both the Netherlands, and Austria, eventually grossing $8.4 million, and $6.2 million in those countries respectively. The movie also opened at No. 1 in Belgium, with
$587,000, eventually grossing $4.4 million.

In Italy, the film had a second place start, grossing $3.3 million in its opening weekend there, moving up to no. 1 on its second week, with $4.2 million grossed. It has since grossed $14.1 million there.

In France, the film debuted at No. 2, grossing $3 million in 348 theatres during its opening weekend, eventually grossing $11.5 million in the country.

North AmericaTed earned $2.6 million in midnight showings in the United States and Canada. For its opening day, Ted scored one of the best R-rated comedy debuts ever since The Hangover with an estimated $20.2 million. The film earned a total of $54.4 million in its opening weekend, well over second-place R-rated Magic Mikes $39.2 million. Its overall weekend gross set a record for the highest original R-rated comedy opening in history. It was the first time two R-rated films grossed more than $21 million each during a weekend.

In Mexico, the film debuted in first place with $2.1 million, grossing $13.4 million.

OceaniaTed also debuted at No. 1 in Australia and New Zealand, grossing over $35.5 million and $3.5 million respectively. Its $13.1 million opening in Australia, of which $4.5 million were from previews, was Universal's biggest opening ever in the country. In Australia, Ted was rated MA 15+, whereas in New Zealand, it was rated R13 for its theatrical release and R16 for the DVD/Blu-ray release.

South America
In Brazil, the film opened with $1.4 million at 273 sites,  moving up to 1st place in the country on its third week of release. It has since grossed $8.8 million there.

The film also grossed $4.6 million in Argentina, 2 million in Chile, 1.9 million in Peru, and 1.7 million in Colombia.

Critical reception
 On Metacritic, the film has an average score of 62 out of 100 based on 37 critics, indicating "generally favorable reviews". Audiences polled by CinemaScore gave the film an average grade of "A−" on an A+ to F scale.

Roger Ebert gave the film three-and-a-half stars out of four, citing the film as "the best comedy screenplay so far [this year]," also praising the film on the fact that it "doesn't run out of steam."

Nathan Rabin of The A.V. Club gave the film a "B" grade. Brent McNight of Beyond Hollywood commented on the jokes: "Some of these jokes hit, some jokes miss." On the other hand, A. O. Scott of The New York Times called Ted "boring, lazy and wildly unoriginal."

Accolades

Home media
The film was released on DVD and Blu-ray in the United States on December 11, 2012, by Universal Studios Home Entertainment. Both formats featured an unrated version of the film (112 minutes) and were also released in Australia on November 21, 2012, in an "Extended Edition". It was released on DVD and Blu-ray in the United Kingdom on November 26, 2012.

On May 3, 2016, Ted vs. Flash Gordon: The Ultimate Collection was released on Blu-ray plus Digital HD, featuring Flash Gordon and the unrated versions of Ted and Ted 2.

Future
Sequel

During the 2012 American Dad! Comic-Con panel, MacFarlane stated that he would be open to a sequel to Ted. In September 2012, chief executive Steve Burke said that the studio would be looking to make a sequel to Ted "as soon as possible".

On Anderson Live, Wahlberg confirmed that a sequel was in the works and that it would be the first sequel in his career, while also revealing that he and Ted (as voiced by MacFarlane) would appear at the 85th Academy Awards.

In February 2014, Deadline reported that Amanda Seyfried had been cast as the female lead, and that Kunis would not return. On July 8, MacFarlane announced that work had officially begun on the sequel. Ted 2'' was released in the US on June 26, 2015.

Television series

In June 2021, it was announced that a live-action prequel television series of the film had been ordered at Peacock. It will be a co-production between Universal Content Productions, Fuzzy Door Productions and MRC Television with MacFarlane and Erica Huggins as executive producers. The series will center on John and Ted as teenagers in 1993. In April 2022, it was announced that Giorgia Whigham, Max Burkholder and Scott Grimes were cast as series regulars, in addition to MacFarlane reprising the voice of Ted. In May 2022, Alanna Ubach joined the cast as a series regular.

References

External links

 
 
 

2012 films
2010s buddy comedy films
2012 fantasy films
2012 directorial debut films
2012 comedy films
2010s sex comedy films
2010s English-language films
2010s American films
American buddy comedy films
American fantasy comedy films
American sex comedy films
American satirical films
Films adapted into television shows
Films about alcoholism
Films about bears
Films about drugs
Films about sexuality
Films about wish fulfillment
Films directed by Seth MacFarlane
Films produced by Scott Stuber
Films scored by Walter Murphy
Films set in 1985
Films set in 2008
Films set in 2012
Films set in Boston
Films shot in Boston
Films shot in Vancouver
Films with screenplays by Seth MacFarlane
Films produced by Seth MacFarlane
Fuzzy Door Productions films
Media Rights Capital films
Magic realism films
Films using motion capture
Films about sentient toys
Universal Pictures films
Ted (franchise)
Films involved in plagiarism controversies